Stenophatna is a genus of moths in the family Lasiocampidae. The genus was erected by Per Olof Christopher Aurivillius in 1909.

Species
Stenophatna accolita Zolotuhin & Prozorov, 2010
Stenophatna foedifraga Zolotuhin & Prozorov, 2010
Stenophatna libera Aurivillius, 1914
Stenophatna marshalli Aurivillius, 1909
Stenophatna proxima Romieux, 1943

External links

Lasiocampidae